South Lanarkshire Council is the unitary authority serving the South Lanarkshire council area in Scotland. The council has its headquarters in Hamilton, has 16,000 employees, and a budget of almost £1bn. The large and varied geographical territory takes in rural and upland areas, market towns such as Lanark, Strathaven and Carluke, the urban burghs of Rutherglen, Cambuslang, and East Kilbride which was Scotland's first new town. The area was formed in 1996 from the areas of Clydesdale, Hamilton and East Kilbride districts, and some outer areas of Glasgow district (Rutherglen/Fernhill, Cambuslang/Halfway and part of King's Park/Toryglen); all were previously within the Strathclyde region from 1975 but in historic Lanarkshire prior to that.

Political control
The first election to South Lanarkshire Council was held in 1995, initially operating as a shadow authority alongside the outgoing authorities until the new system came into force on 1 April 1996. Political control of the council since 1996 has been as follows:

Leadership
South Lanarkshire operates a cabinet style system, with key decisions being taken by the Executive Committee, under the leadership of the Council Leader, and approved by the council, chaired by the provost.

The first leader of South Lanarkshire Council, selected from among the sitting councillors, was Tom McCabe who previously held the same office at Hamilton District. When McCabe was elected as an MSP in 1999, the role went to his deputy Eddie McAvoy - brother of one of the region's MPs Tommy McAvoy - who held the post for the next 18 years until his retirement ahead of the 2017 election. The new leader from 2017 was John Ross.

The ambassadorial role of provost is also filled by one of the serving councillors. Office holders include:

 Sam Casserly (1995–1999) - previous provost of Hamilton district
 Alan Dick (1999–2003)
 Mushtaq Ahmad (2003–2007)
 Russell Clearie (2007–2012)
 Eileen Logan (2012–2017) - previous provost of Clydesdale district
 Ian McAllan (2017–2022)
 Margaret Cooper (2022–present)

The leaders of the council since 1996 have been:

Current composition
As at 5 May 2022:

Elections
Since 2007 elections have been held every five years under the single transferable vote system, introduced by the Local Governance (Scotland) Act 2004. Election results since 1995 have been as follows:

Premises

The Council Headquarters building, on Almada Street, Hamilton, was built as the Lanark County Buildings in 1963, and designed by county architect David Gordon Bannerman. The 17 storey,  tower is the tallest building in the council area, is Category A-listed, and is a highly visible landmark across this part of the Clyde Valley. The modernist design was influenced by the United Nations building in New York City. At the front of the building is the circular council chamber, and a plaza with water features. Between 1975 and 1996 the building had been used as a sub-regional office of Strathclyde Regional Council, with Hamilton District Council using Hamilton Townhouse in that time. On the creation of South Lanarkshire Council in 1996 the new council chose to base itself at the Almada Street building.

Wards
In the council's initial 12 years, individual wards (73 in 1995, adjusted down to 67 in 1999 and 2003) each electing one councillor using the First past the post method.

Since the 2007 South Lanarkshire Council election, there are 20 council wards in South Lanarkshire, each serving a population ranging from 13,000 to 20,000 and each ward represented on the council by 3 or 4 councillors elected using single transferable vote; in 2007 and 2012 this produced a total of 67 available seats, which was adjusted down to 64 in 2017 along with boundary adjustments, although the same number of wards overall.

References 

Local authorities of Scotland
Politics of South Lanarkshire
Organisations based in South Lanarkshire
Hamilton, South Lanarkshire